Dedimar Ferreira das Chagas (born 22 April 1992), commonly known as Dedimar or Dedimar Ferreira, is a Brazilian footballer.

Career statistics

Club

Notes

References

1992 births
Living people
Brazilian footballers
Brazilian expatriate footballers
Association football defenders
Azerbaijan Premier League players
Myanmar National League players
Araxá Esporte Clube players
Sinop Futebol Clube players
Atlético Rio Negro Clube players
Kapaz PFK players
Shan United F.C. players
Brazilian expatriate sportspeople in Azerbaijan
Expatriate footballers in Azerbaijan
Brazilian expatriate sportspeople in Myanmar
Expatriate footballers in Myanmar
People from Manaus
Sportspeople from Amazonas (Brazilian state)